Mamá Inés is a 1945 Mexican film. It stars Sara García.

External links
 

1945 films
1940s Spanish-language films
Mexican black-and-white films
Mexican comedy films
1945 comedy films
1940s Mexican films